The following lists events that happened during 2006 in the Republic of Fiji.

Incumbents
President: Josefa Iloilo (until December 5), Frank Bainimarama (starting December 5)
Vice-President: Joni Madraiwiwi (until December 5), vacant thereafter
Prime Minister: Laisenia Qarase (until December 5), Jona Senilagakali (starting December 5)

Events

June
 June 22 - Mahendra Chaudhry warns that the Fiji Labour Party will withdraw from the coalition government if government programs continue to be biased towards indigenous Fijians.

December
December 5 — Commodore Frank Bainimarama, Commander of the Republic of Fiji Military Forces, overthrows the government of Prime Minister Laisenia Qarase.

References

 
2000s in Fiji
Years of the 21st century in Fiji
Fiji
Fiji